The Flag of New Holland, also known as the flag of Dutch Brazil, was the flag used by the Dutch West India Company for the territories that were under its control in Brazil from 1630 until 1654. In this period, Brazil was not granted its own flag, and only the flags of its colonizers or rulers were used.

History

The conquered captaincies in Brazil during the Dutch rule used the flag of the Dutch West Indies Company (in Dutch: Geoctrooieerde Westindische Compagnie - GWC). This flag consists of the Republic of the Seven United Provinces of the Netherlands flag – horizontally striped in red (or orange), white and blue – with the inclusion of the company monogram (GWC) in the center.

The variation of orange or red on the flag is due to the fact that between 1588 and 1630 the Dutch navy always displayed the Prince's flag (Prinsenvlag), striped in orange, white and blue, and from 1663 on, always the flag of the General States flag (Statenvlag), striped in red, white, blue, with both variants of the flag being used during the period of 1630–1662.

It is quite possible that the Prinsenvlag and Statenvlag themselves were used in Brazil: in the book Ambrosij Richszhoffers, braszilianisch- und west indianische Reisze Beschreibung, private Ambrose Richshoffer records the use of the Prince's flag, as well as mentioning the use of its colors in the ensign costume

In the pictorial representations associated with Dutch Brazil, such as maps, engravings, paintings of battles, one rarely finds elements in the images that refer specifically to the West India Company (such as the monogram of the company), with the flags being represented just by the tricolor stripes. In a few engravings, one finds the reference to the company or its commanders, by means of coats of arms or monograms as ornament of the illustrations.

These flags were flown on the tops of forts, on the masts and sterns of ships, as well as wielded on battlefields by the ensign (vaendrager).  The flags on the masts and sterns of ships also were used identify the vessels in combat, the admirals and vice admirals and even the tactical orientation of an attack.

Description
In the book Brazões e Bandeiras do Brasil written by the journalist Clóvis Ribeiro in 1933, the flag of Dutch Brazil was illustrated by José Wasth Rodrigues and it consists of three horizontal stripes in the colors of the flag of the Republic of the Seven United Netherlands (red, white and blue) and it displays the monogram CIMD in the center of the white stripe and a crown above it, on the upper stripe, both gold-coloured. This illustration, however, is not found in the references cited by Ribeiro: in the German almanac Der Geöfnete Ritter-Plaz (Hamburg, 1702) there is only the tricolor flag of the United Provinces while in the book Rerum per octennium in Brasilia (Amsterdam, 1647) by Gaspar Barleus the Dutch flags are represented in the engravings without any inscription, with the exception of plate #45 (entitled  Quartum prælium Coniovian inter et fluvium Rio Grande), where there is Dutch flag with the monogram IM in the cartouche of the illustration.

While the flag of the Dutch West India Company is relatively well documented, one finds no records of the tricolor flag with the IM or CIMD monogram in flag books or flag diagrams published between before the 19th century. Nevertheless, Clovis Ribeiro's work popularized such a design as the flag of Dutch Brazil, and it has been reproduced by several authors since then.

Nassau's Monogram

The CIMD monogram with the crown of count is displayed in the frontispiece of Barleu's work, and it's associated with John Maurice, Prince of Nassau-Siegen, who ruled New Holland during 1637–1644 on behalf of the West India Company.

Its exact meaning is not known, but it is certain that the initials IM refer to Ionannes Mauritius, i.e., John Maurice of Nassau, as they are also represented in the painting Black Molher by Zacharias Wagenaer, and on other objects, such as a marble chair given as a gift by Nassau.

According to German archivist Rolf Nagel, the "I" and "M" of the monogram stand for "IOHANNES MAURITIUS", and make indication to the name of the flag holder; while and "C" and "D" are his personal qualities "COMES" and "DOMINUS", and the monogram should be read as "COMES IOHANNES MAURITIUS DOMINUS". Another plausible hypothesis is that the monogram means "Iohannes Mauritius Comitis Dillenburgum", i.e. "John Maurice, Count of (Nassau-)Dillenburg", Dillenburg being Maurice of Nassau's hometown. The last plate of Rerum per octennium in Brasilia is dedicated to the city of Dillenburg and adorned with Nassau's coat of arms.

See also 
 Flag of the Netherlands

References

Bibliography

External links 
 Flags of Brazil 

Historical flags
Flags of Brazil
Dutch Brazil